Prompton is a borough in Wayne County, Pennsylvania, United States. The population was 250 at the 2010 census.

Geography
Prompton is located at  (41.582133, -75.329922).

Demographics

2010 census

As of the census of 2010, there were 250 people, 104 households, and 68 families living in the borough. The population density was 156.25 people per square mile (60.3/km2). There were 111 housing units at an average density of 69.4 per square mile. The racial makeup of the borough was 96.8% White and 3.2% from two or more races. Hispanic or Latino of any race were 3.2% of the population.

Of the 104 households 29.8% had children under the age of 18 living with them, 46.2% were married couples living together, 12.5% had a female householder with no husband present, and 34.6% were non-families. 28.8% of households were one person and 16.3% were one person aged 65 or older. The average household size was 2.40 and the average family size was 2.96.

The age distribution was 24% under the age of 18, 59.6% from 18 to 64, and 16.4% 65 or older. The median age was 39.7 years.

The median household income was $24,375 and the median family income  was $31,250. Males had a median income of $31,071 versus $19,167 for females. The per capita income for the borough was $15,601. About 12.2% of families and 10.8% of the population were below the poverty line, including 22.6% of those under the age of eighteen and 9.5% of those sixty five or over.

2000 census
At the 2000 census there were 243 people, 103 households, and 71 families living in the borough. The population density was 152.4 people per square mile (59.0/km2). There were 112 housing units at an average density of 70.2 per square mile (27.2/km2).  The racial makeup of the borough was 98.77% White, 0.82% Asian, and 0.41% from two or more races.
Of the 103 households 31.1% had children under the age of 18 living with them, 57.3% were married couples living together, 9.7% had a female householder with no husband present, and 30.1% were non-families. 28.2% of households were one person and 16.5% were one person aged 65 or older. The average household size was 2.36 and the average family size was 2.88.

The age distribution was 24.7% under the age of 18, 3.3% from 18 to 24, 28.0% from 25 to 44, 25.5% from 45 to 64, and 18.5% 65 or older. The median age was 42 years. For every 100 females there were 94.4 males. For every 100 females age 18 and over, there were 84.8 males.

The median household income was $24,375 and the median family income  was $31,250. Males had a median income of $31,071 versus $19,167 for females. The per capita income for the borough was $15,601. About 12.2% of families and 10.8% of the population were below the poverty line, including 22.6% of those under the age of eighteen and 9.5% of those sixty five or over.

References

External links 
Prompton Fire & Rescue Unit

Boroughs in Wayne County, Pennsylvania
Populated places established in 1818